Peter Sproule (born 1947) is an English actor. His roles include a guest appearance on an early episode of Upstairs, Downstairs. He trained at the Royal Academy of Dramatic Art and made his first appearance at the Bristol Old Vic in 1968.

Filmography

References

External links

1947 births
Living people
Male actors from Hertfordshire
English male stage actors
Alumni of RADA
20th-century English male actors
People from Hitchin